Face Off is the fourth studio album by American rapper and producer Pastor Troy. It was released on May 22, 2001 through Madd Society/Universal Records. Production was handled by Carl Mo, Big Toombs, Benny "DaDa" Tillman, Carlos "Los Vagez" Thornton, Gene Griffin, Paul Wright, and Pastor Troy himself. It features guest appearances from Co-Ed, Nature Boy and Lil Pete. The album peaked at number 83 on the Billboard 200 in the United States.

Track listing

Notes
Tracks 10-12 were previously released on Pastor Troy's 1999 album We Ready (I Declare War).
Tracks 3-5, 8, 13-14 were previously released on Pastor Troy's 2000 album I Am D.S.G.B..

Personnel

Micah Troy – main artist, producer (tracks: 2, 4, 5, 8-10, 12-14), executive producer
Yizar "Nature Boy" Rainwater – featured artist (track 4)
Co-Ed – featured artists (track 7)
Lil Pete – featured artist (track 9)
Tony Love – guitar (tracks: 2, 8)
Dale "Rambro" Ramsey – ProTools, recording (track 1), mixing (tracks: 2, 6, 7)
Carl Mahone Jr. – producer (tracks: 3, 6, 9)
Benny "DaDa" Tillman – producer (track 7)
Carlos "Los Vagez" Thornton – producer (track 7)
Big Toombs – producer (tracks: 11, 12)
Gene Griffin – producer (track 11)
Paul Wright – producer (track 11)
Ismel "Nino" Ramos – recording (tracks: 2, 3, 6, 7)
Khali Fani – recording (tracks: 4, 5, 8, 9, 13, 14)
Mike Wilson – recording (tracks: 3, 6, 7), mixing (tracks: 3-5, 8-10, 12-14)
Sol Messiah – recording (tracks: 4, 5, 8, 9, 13, 14)
Chris Athens – mastering
Sandy Brummels – art direction
Robert Sims – design
Jonathan Mannion – photography
Eloise Bryan – A&R
Marcus Smith – A&R
Jeya Larkins – A&R
Elaine Lee – A&R
Chris Lighty – management

Charts

References

External links

2001 albums
Pastor Troy albums